The Binalud Mountain Range or the Binalud Range ( - Bīnālūd) is a mountain range that runs in a northwest-southeast direction between the Nishapur and Mashhad regions in Razavi Khorasan Province in northeastern Iran, to the southeast of the Caspian Sea. Although far from the Aladagh Mountains, which lie to the northwest in the Province of North Khorasan,  the Binalud Mountains are located in such a way that both the Aladagh Mountains and the Binalud Range lie approximately in the same arc, curving from the northwest to the southeast. The city of Mashhad or Meshed is located in the northeastern part of the Binalud Range, and the city of Nishapur or Neyshabur lies on the southwestern section of the range. Situated somewhat to the west of the Binalud Range proper,  and with an elevation of 3211 metres, Mount Binalud is the highest point both of the Binalud Mountains and of Razavi Khorasan Province as a whole.

Geology

The mountain range was formed mainly in the Miocene and the Pliocene during the Alpine orogeny and is made predominantly of Triassic and Jurassic rocks, with chiefly Jurassic rocks in the northwestern part and a smaller portion of Paleozoic rocks in the western section. On the southern margin of the range and along the same northwest-southeast direction, there is a strip of Eocene rocks. On the northwestern side of this strip, there is another section of Eocene rocks that are volcanic in origin. The well-known Nishabur turquoise comes from the weathered and broken trachytes and andesites of the Eocene volcanic rocks of this part of the mountain range. The main turquoise mines are situated about 50 kilometres northwest of the city of Nishapur in the vicinity of a village called Madan.

The mountains form part of the faulting resulting from the collision of the Arabian plate with the Eurasian plate.

Climate
Although the Binalud Mountains are among rather higher mountains of Iran and are located in the northeastern part of Iran far from the northwestern and western mountains of the country, the mountain range still has a generally Mediterranean climate.

Binalud Mountain Range in Persian Mythology

Gallery of the southern foothill

Images

Panorama

References

Mountain ranges of Iran
Landforms of Razavi Khorasan Province